The 2024 United States House of Representatives elections in California will be held on November 5, 2024, to elect the 52 U.S. representatives from the State of California, one from all 52 of the state's congressional districts. The elections will coincide with the 2024 U.S. presidential election, as well as other elections to the House of Representatives, elections to the United States Senate, and various state and local elections.

Three incumbent representatives, Barbara Lee of the 12th district, Adam Schiff of the 30th district, and Katie Porter of the 47th district, have announced they will not seek re-election in 2024 and will instead run for U.S. Senate.

House Majority PAC, a super PAC affiliated with the Democratic Party, has announced that it will target four California Republicans in 2024:  Mike Garcia of the 27th district, Young Kim of the 40th district, Ken Calvert of the 41st district, and Michelle Steel of the 45th district. Garcia, Kim, and Steel all represent districts that Joe Biden won in the 2020 presidential election, while Calvert's district narrowly voted for Donald Trump. There are two other California Republican who represent Biden-won districts, John Duarte of the 13th district and David Valadao of the 22nd district. However, some Democratic strategists see Valadao's seat as being out of reach due to his repeated victories.

Several California Republicans will receive assistance from Protect the House 2024, a joint fundraising committee launched by U.S. Speaker of the House Kevin McCarthy to support vulnerable House Republicans. Among the representatives included in the committee are Duarte, Valadao, Garcia, Calvert, and Steel, as well as Kevin Kiley of the 3rd district.

District 1

Republican Doug LaMalfa, who has represented the district since 2013, was re-elected with 62.1% of the vote in 2022.

Candidates

Potential 
Doug LaMalfa (Republican), incumbent U.S. Representative

Predictions

District 2

Democrat Jared Huffman, who has represented the district since 2013, was re-elected with 74.4% of the vote in 2022.

Candidates

Potential 
Jared Huffman (Democratic), incumbent U.S. Representative

Predictions

District 3

The incumbent is Republican Kevin Kiley, who was elected with 53.2% of the vote in 2022.

Candidates

Potential 
Kevin Kiley (Republican), incumbent U.S. Representative

Predictions

District 4

Democrat Mike Thompson, who has represented the district since 2013, was re-elected with 67.8% of the vote in 2022.

Candidates

Potential 
Mike Thompson (Democratic), incumbent U.S. Representative

Predictions

District 5

Republican Tom McClintock, who has represented the district since 2009, was re-elected with 61.3% of the vote in 2022.

Candidates

Potential 
Tom McClintock (Republican), incumbent U.S. Representative

Predictions

District 6

Democrat Ami Bera, who has represented the district since 2013, was re-elected with 55.9% of the vote in 2022.

Candidates

Potential 
Ami Bera (Democratic), incumbent U.S. Representative
Tamika Hamilton (Republican)
Omba Kipuke (Democratic)

Predictions

District 7

Democrat Doris Matsui, who has represented the district since 2013, was re-elected with 68.3% of the vote in 2022.

Candidates

Potential 
Doris Matsui (Democratic), incumbent U.S. Representative

Predictions

District 8

Democrat John Garamendi, who has represented the district since 2013, was re-elected with 75.7% of the vote in 2022.

Candidates

Potential 
John Garamendi (Democratic), incumbent U.S. Representative

Predictions

District 9

Democrat Josh Harder, who has represented the district since 2019, was re-elected with 54.9% of the vote in 2022.

Candidates

Potential 
Josh Harder (Democratic), incumbent U.S. Representative

Predictions

District 10

Democrat Mark DeSaulnier, who has represented the district since 2015, was re-elected with 78.9% of the vote in 2022.

Candidates

Potential 
Mark DeSaulnier (Democratic), incumbent U.S. Representative

Predictions

District 11

The incumbent is Democrat Nancy Pelosi, who was re-elected with 84.0% of the vote in 2022. In 2023, after 20 years of alternating between Speaker of the House and House Minority Leader, Pelosi announced she would step down from House leadership. Speculation begun that she would not seek re-election in 2024.

Candidates

Filed paperwork 
Nancy Pelosi (Democratic), incumbent U.S. Representative

Formed exploratory committee 
Scott Wiener (Democratic), state senator

Potential 
London Breed (Democratic), mayor of San Francisco
David Chiu (Democratic), San Francisco City Attorney and former state assemblyman
Matt Haney (Democratic), state assemblyman
Jane Kim (Democratic), director of the California Working Families Party, member of the San Francisco County Democratic Central Committee, and former San Francisco supervisor
Christine Pelosi (Democratic), political strategist, former Democratic National Committee member, and daughter of incumbent Nancy Pelosi

Predictions

District 12

The incumbent is Democrat Barbara Lee, who was re-elected with 90.5% of the vote in 2022. She is not seeking re-election, instead choosing to run for the U.S. Senate.

Candidates

Declared 
Lateefah Simon (Democratic), president of the Bay Area Rapid Transit Board of Directors and California State University trustee

Filed paperwork 
Tony Daysog (Democratic), vice mayor of Alameda

Publicly expressed interest 
Loren Taylor (Democratic), former Oakland city councilor and runnner-up for mayor of Oakland in 2022

Declined 
Nikki Fortunato Bas (Democratic), president of the Oakland City Council
Mia Bonta (Democratic), state assemblywoman (endorsed Simon)
Dan Kalb (Democratic), Oakland city councilor (running for state senate)
Barbara Lee (Democratic), incumbent U.S. Representative (running for U.S. Senate)
Libby Schaaf (Democratic), former mayor of Oakland (endorsed Simon)
Nancy Skinner (Democratic), state senator (endorsed Simon)
Buffy Wicks (Democratic), state assemblywoman (endorsed Simon)

Endorsements

Predictions

District 13

The incumbent is Republican John Duarte, who flipped the district and was elected with 50.2% of the vote in 2022.

Candidates

Declared 
Phil Arballo (Democratic), financial advisor, candidate for this district in 2022, and runner-up for the 22nd district in 2020

Filed paperwork 
Adam Gray (Democratic), former state assemblyman and runner-up for this district in 2022

Potential 
John Duarte (Republican), incumbent U.S. Representative

Predictions

District 14

Democrat Eric Swalwell, who has represented the district since 2013, was re-elected with 69.3% of the vote in 2022.

Candidates

Potential 
Eric Swalwell (Democratic), incumbent U.S. Representative

Predictions

District 15

Democrat Kevin Mullin, who has represented the district since 2023, was elected with 55.5% of the vote in 2022.

Candidates

Potential 
Kevin Mullin (Democratic), incumbent U.S. Representative

Predictions

District 16

The incumbent is Democrat Anna Eshoo, who was re-elected with 57.8% of the vote in 2022 against another Democrat.

Candidates

Publicly expressed interest 
Sam Liccardo (Democratic), former mayor of San Jose

Potential 
Anna Eshoo (Democratic), incumbent U.S. Representative
Joe Simitian (Democratic), Santa Clara County supervisor and former state senator

Predictions

District 17

The incumbent is Democrat Ro Khanna, who was re-elected with 70.9% of the vote in 2022. Khanna has expressed interest in running for U.S. Senate.

Candidates

Potential 
Ro Khanna (Democratic), incumbent U.S. Representative
Alex Lee (Democratic), state assemblyman
Evan Low (Democratic), state assemblyman
Aisha Wahab (Democratic), state senator

Predictions

District 18

The incumbent is Democrat Zoe Lofgren, who was re-elected with 65.8% of the vote in 2022.

Candidates

Declared 
Peter Hernandez (Republican), former chair of the San Benito County Board of Supervisors and runner-up for this district in 2022
Zoe Lofgren (Democratic), incumbent U.S. Representative

Publicly expressed interest 
Sam Liccardo (Democratic), former mayor of San Jose

Predictions

District 19

Democrat Jimmy Panetta, who has represented the district since 2017, was re-elected with 68.8% of the vote in 2022.

Candidates

Potential 
Jimmy Panetta (Democratic), incumbent U.S. Representative

Predictions

District 20

The incumbent is Republican Kevin McCarthy, who was re-elected with 67.2% of the vote in 2022.

Candidates

Declared
John Burrows (Democratic), Fresno public relations director
Andy Morales (Democratic), security officer

Potential
Kevin McCarthy, incumbent U.S. Representative and Speaker of the House

Predictions

District 21

Democrat Jim Costa, who has represented the district since 2013, was re-elected with 54.0% of the vote in 2022.

Candidates

Declared 
Michael Maher (Republican), aviation business owner and runner-up for this district in 2022

Potential 
Jim Costa (Democratic), incumbent U.S. Representative

Endorsements

Predictions

District 22

The incumbent is Republican David Valadao, who was re-elected with 51.6% of the vote in 2022.

Candidates

Filed paperwork 
Rudy Salas (Democratic), former state assemblyman and runner-up for this district in 2022

Potential 
David Valadao (Republican), incumbent U.S. Representative

Predictions

District 23

Republican Jay Obernolte, who has represented the district since 2021, was re-elected with 61.0% of the vote in 2022.

Candidates

Potential 
Jay Obernolte (Republican), incumbent U.S. Representative

Predictions

District 24

Democrat Salud Carbajal, who has represented the district since 2017, was re-elected with 60.7% of the vote in 2022.

Candidates

Potential 
Salud Carbajal (Democratic), incumbent U.S. Representative

Predictions

District 25

Democrat Raul Ruiz, who has represented the district since 2013, was re-elected with 57.4% of the vote in 2022.

Candidates

Potential 
Raul Ruiz (Democratic), incumbent U.S. Representative

Predictions

District 26

Democrat Julia Brownley, who has represented the district since 2013, was re-elected with 54.5% of the vote in 2022.

Candidates

Potential 
Julia Brownley (Democratic), incumbent U.S. Representative

Predictions

District 27

The incumbent is Republican Mike Garcia, who was re-elected with 53.2% of the vote in 2022.

Candidates

Declared 
George Whitesides (Democratic), former NASA chief of staff and former CEO of Virgin Galactic

Filed paperwork 
Franky Carrillo (Democratic), member of the Los Angeles County Probation Oversight Commission

Potential 
Mike Garcia (Republican), incumbent U.S. Representative

Endorsements

Predictions

District 28

Democrat Judy Chu, who has represented the district since 2013, was re-elected with 66.2% of the vote in 2022.

Candidates

Potential 
Judy Chu (Democratic), incumbent U.S. Representative

Predictions

District 29

Democrat Tony Cárdenas, who has represented the district since 2013, was re-elected with 58.5% of the vote in 2022.

Candidates

Potential 
Tony Cárdenas (Democratic), incumbent U.S. Representative

Predictions

District 30

The incumbent is Democrat Adam Schiff, who was re-elected with 71.1% of the vote in 2022 against another Democrat. He is not seeking re-election, instead choosing to run for the U.S. Senate.

Candidates

Declared 
Joshua Bocanegra (Democratic), software developer
Mike Feuer (Democratic), former Los Angeles City Attorney
Laura Friedman (Democratic), state assemblywoman
Maebe A. Girl (Democratic), Silver Lake neighborhood council board member and runner-up for this district in 2022
Nick Melvoin (Democratic), member of the Los Angeles Board of Education
Anthony Portantino (Democratic), state senator
Ben Savage (Democratic), actor
Sepi Shyne (Democratic), mayor of West Hollywood

Declined 
Paul Krekorian (Democratic), president of the Los Angeles City Council
Adam Schiff (Democratic), incumbent U.S. Representative (running for U.S. Senate)

Endorsements

Predictions

District 31

The incumbent is Democrat Grace Napolitano, who was re-elected with 59.5% of the vote in 2022.

Candidates

Filed paperwork 
Grace Napolitano (Democratic), incumbent U.S. Representative

Predictions

District 32

Democrat Brad Sherman, who has represented the district since 2013, was re-elected with 69.2% of the vote in 2022.

Candidates

Potential 
Brad Sherman (Democratic), incumbent U.S. Representative

Predictions

District 33

Democrat Pete Aguilar, who has represented the district since 2015, was re-elected with 61.3% of the vote in 2022.

Candidates

Potential 
Pete Aguilar (Democratic), incumbent U.S. Representative

Predictions

District 34

Democrat Jimmy Gomez, who has represented the district since 2017, was re-elected with 51.3% of the vote in 2022.

Candidates

Potential 
Jimmy Gomez (Democratic), incumbent U.S. Representative

Predictions

District 35

Democrat Norma Torres, who has represented the district since 2015, was re-elected with 57.4% of the vote in 2022.

Candidates

Potential 
Norma Torres (Democratic), incumbent U.S. Representative

Predictions

District 36

Democrat Ted Lieu, who has represented the district since 2015, was re-elected with 69.8% of the vote in 2022.

Candidates

Potential 
Ted Lieu (Democratic), incumbent U.S. Representative

Predictions

District 37

Democrat Sydney Kamlager-Dove, who has represented the district since 2023, was elected with 64.0% of the vote in 2022.

Candidates

Potential 
Sydney Kamlager-Dove (Democratic), incumbent U.S. Representative

Predictions

District 38

Democrat Linda Sánchez, who has represented the district since 2013, was re-elected with 58.1% of the vote in 2022.

Candidates

Potential 
Linda Sánchez (Democratic), incumbent U.S. Representative

Predictions

District 39

Democrat Mark Takano, who has represented the district since 2013, was re-elected with 57.7% of the vote in 2022.

Candidates

Potential 
Mark Takano (Democratic), incumbent U.S. Representative

Predictions

District 40

The incumbent is Republican Young Kim, who was re-elected with 56.8% of the vote in 2022.

Candidates

Declared 
Young Kim (Republican), incumbent U.S. Representative

Predictions

District 41

The incumbent is Republican Ken Calvert, who was re-elected with 52.3% of the vote in 2022.

Candidates

Potential 
Ken Calvert (Republican), incumbent U.S. Representative
Will Rollins (Democratic), former federal prosecutor and runner-up for this district in 2022

Predictions

District 42

Democrat Robert Garcia, who has represented the district since 2023, was elected with 68.4% of the vote in 2022.

Candidates

Potential 
Robert Garcia (Democratic), incumbent U.S. Representative

Predictions

District 43

Democrat Maxine Waters, who has represented the district since 1991, was re-elected with 77.3% of the vote in 2022.

Candidates

Potential 
Maxine Waters (Democratic), incumbent U.S. Representative

Predictions

District 44

Democrat Nanette Barragán, who has represented the district since 2017, was re-elected with 72.2% of the vote in 2022.

Candidates

Potential 
Nanette Barragán (Democratic), incumbent U.S. Representative

Predictions

District 45

The incumbent is Republican Michelle Steel, who was re-elected with 52.4% of the vote in 2022.

Candidates

Declared
Kim Bernice Nguyen (Democratic), Garden Grove city councilor and runner-up for Orange County Board of Supervisors District 2 in 2022

Potential 
Jay Chen (Democratic), Mt. San Antonio College trustee and runner-up for this district in 2022
Michelle Steel (Republican), incumbent U.S. Representative

Predictions

District 46

Democrat Lou Correa, who has represented the district since 2017, was re-elected with 61.8% of the vote in 2022.

Candidates

Potential 
Lou Correa (Democratic), incumbent U.S. Representative

Predictions

District 47

The incumbent is Democrat Katie Porter, who was re-elected with 51.7% of the vote in 2022. She is not seeking re-election, instead choosing to run for the U.S. Senate.

Candidates

Declared 
Scott Baugh (Republican), former state assemblyman, former chair of the Orange County Republican Party, and runner-up for this district in 2022
Dom Jones (Democratic), gym owner and contestant on The Amazing Race 34
Dave Min (Democratic), state senator and candidate for this district in 2018
Harley Rouda (Democratic), former U.S. Representative
Joanna Weiss (Democratic), community activist

Filed paperwork 
Brian Burley (Republican), IT analyst and candidate in 2022
Lori Kirkland Baker (Democratic), Emmy-winning television producer

Declined 
Katrina Foley (Democratic), Orange County supervisor
Josh Newman (Democratic), state senator (running for re-election)
Katie Porter (Democratic), incumbent U.S. Representative (running for U.S. Senate, endorsed Min)

Endorsements

Predictions

District 48

Republican Darrell Issa, who has represented the district since 2021, was re-elected with 60.4% of the vote in 2022.

Candidates

Potential 
Darrell Issa (Republican), incumbent U.S. Representative

Predictions

District 49

The incumbent is Democrat Mike Levin, who was re-elected with 52.6% of the vote in 2022.

Candidates

Potential 
Mike Levin (Democratic), incumbent U.S. Representative

Predictions

District 50

Democrat Scott Peters, who has represented the district since 2013, was re-elected with 62.8% of the vote in 2022.

Candidates

Potential 
Scott Peters (Democratic), incumbent U.S. Representative

Predictions

District 51

Democrat Sara Jacobs, who has represented the district since 2021, was re-elected with 61.9% of the vote in 2022.

Candidates

Declared 
 Bill Wells (Republican), mayor of El Cajon

Potential 
Sara Jacobs (Democratic), incumbent U.S. Representative

Predictions

District 52

Democrat Juan Vargas, who has represented the district since 2013, was re-elected with 66.7% of the vote in 2022.

Candidates

Potential 
Juan Vargas (Democratic), incumbent U.S. Representative

Predictions

Notes

References

2024
California
United States House of Representatives